Geraldine Estelle Horner (née Halliwell; born 6 August 1972) is an English singer, songwriter, author, and actress. She rose to prominence in the 1990s as Ginger Spice, a member of the girl group the Spice Girls. With over 100 million records sold worldwide, the Spice Girls are the best-selling female group of all time. Their slogan "girl power" was most closely associated with Halliwell, and her Union Jack dress from the 1997 Brit Awards also became an enduring symbol. Halliwell left the Spice Girls in 1998, citing exhaustion and creative differences, but rejoined when they reunited in 2007.

In 1999, Halliwell released her debut solo album, Schizophonic, which produced the UK number-one singles "Mi Chico Latino", "Lift Me Up" and "Bag It Up"; the lead single, "Look at Me", reached number two. In 2001, she released her second album, Scream If You Wanna Go Faster; the lead single, "It's Raining Men", reached number one in the UK, the biggest hit of her career. "Scream If You Wanna Go Faster" and "Calling", were also top-ten singles. Halliwell's third album, Passion (2005), was preceded by the single "Ride It".

In 2010 and 2012, Halliwell was a guest judge on the seventh and ninth series of The X Factor UK and in 2013, she was a judge on the seventh series on Australia's Got Talent. In September 2013, it was announced that Halliwell would return to the music industry in Australia with the release of her first solo single in eight years, "Half of Me". She has written two autobiographies, including If Only (1999), and a series of children's novels, including Ugenia Lavender.

She has appeared in films including Spice World (1997), Fat Slags: The Film (2004), Crank: High Voltage (2009), The Crown with a Shadow (2021) and stars in the upcoming Gran Turismo, due for a 2023 release.

Early life
Geraldine Estelle Halliwell was born on 6 August 1972 at Watford General Hospital in Watford, Hertfordshire, the daughter of Ana María (née Hidalgo) and Laurence Francis Halliwell (1922–1993). Her mother is Spanish, hailing from Huesca, while her father was of Swedish, English and a "bit of French" descent. Halliwell's paternal grandfather was originally Swedish speaking Finn Mathias Karlson Sjövik, born in Korsnäs, Finland, who emigrated to Sweden. Halliwell grew up on a council estate in North Watford. She was educated at Watford Grammar School for Girls and Camden School for Girls. Before starting her music career, Halliwell had worked as a nightclub dancer in Majorca, a presenter on the Turkish version of Let's Make a Deal, and a glamour model. At the age of 19, she appeared as a Page 3 girl in The Sun. Following her rise to fame, nude photos of Halliwell were republished in a number of magazines such as Playboy and Penthouse in 1998.

Musical career

1994–1998: Spice Girls

In 1994, Halliwell, along with Melanie C, Mel B and Victoria Beckham, responded to an advertisement in The Stage magazine. Around 400 women answered the ad and auditioned at Dance Works studios. After a couple of initial line-up changes, Halliwell, Melanie C, Mel B and Beckham eventually became the members of the group, along with Emma Bunton. The group felt insecure about the lack of a contract and were frustrated by the direction in which Heart Management was steering them, and in October 1994, armed with a catalogue of demos and dance routines, they began touring management agencies. They persuaded Bob Herbert to set up a showcase performance for the group in front of industry writers, producers, and artists and repertoire men in December 1994 at the Nomis Studios in Shepherd's Bush, where they received an "overwhelmingly positive" reaction. Due to the large interest in the group, the Herberts quickly set about creating a binding contract for the group. Encouraged by the reaction they had received at the Nomis showcase, all five members delayed signing contracts on the legal advice from, amongst others, Adams' father Anthony Adams. In March 1995, because of the group's frustration at their management's unwillingness to listen to their visions and ideas, they parted with Heart Management. Halliwell was the oldest member of the group.

The group began a relationship with Simon Fuller of 19 Entertainment and finally signed with him in March 1995. During the summer of that year, the group toured record labels in London and Los Angeles with Fuller and finally signed a deal with Virgin Records in September 1995. From this point on, up to summer 1996, the group continued to write and record tracks for their debut album while extensively touring the West Coast of the United States, where they had signed a publishing deal with Windswept Pacific. On 7 June 1996, the Spice Girls released their debut single, "Wannabe", in the United Kingdom. In the weeks leading up to the release, the video for "Wannabe" got a trial airing on The Box music channel. The song proved to be a global hit, reaching number one in 37 countries, becoming the best-selling single by an all-female group of all time. Shortly after "Wannabe"'s release, each member of the group received a nickname from Top of the Pops magazine. Because of her "liveliness, zest and flaming red hair", Halliwell was named "Ginger Spice". "Wannabe" was followed by nine further number-one singles from their albums Spice, Spiceworld and Forever. Other successful releases followed, including "Say You'll Be There" and "2 Become 1" from Spice, and "Spice Up Your Life", "Too Much" and "Viva Forever" from Spiceworld.

On 31 May 1998, Halliwell announced through her solicitor that she had left the Spice Girls due to depression and differences between the group. Her action aroused controversy, her former group being due to embark on a North American tour, which they eventually completed without her. Although she had already left the group, the Spice Girls released "Viva Forever", the final music video to feature Halliwell's likeness, plus a one-off supergroup called England United for the official England FC song (Jo Whiley introduced the band saying "...plus Geri as a substitute"). After she left, the other girls co-wrote a few songs about her, which appeared on their album Forever: "Goodbye", "Tell Me Why" and "Let Love Lead the Way". The group is among the best-selling girl groups of all time, selling over 75 million albums.

Girl power

Although regularly uttered by all five Spice Girls, the phrase "girl power" was most closely associated with Halliwell and was often accompanied with a V sign. In a Christmas 1996 interview with The Spectator magazine, Halliwell controversially spoke of former Prime Minister Margaret Thatcher as being an inspiration for their girl power ideology. In a 2019 interview with Harper's Bazaar, she said, "For me, if you look it up, it means equalisation between the sexes. It means everybody, whether you're a man, woman or something in between. Forget about labels, it's about embracing everyone's individuality and giving them the opportunity and gender equality and pushing that forward."

Halliwell's association with girl power (and her friendship with George Michael) was spoofed in the BBC comedy series Rock Profile. Halliwell (played by comedian Matt Lucas) is portrayed as a patronising moron who stalks and has delusions about marrying Michael. According to Halliwell, everything is "Girl Power".

1999–2006: Solo material
In 1999, one year after leaving the group, Halliwell launched her solo career and released her debut album Schizophonic, with the lead single "Look at Me", produced by Absolute and Phil Bucknall. "Look at Me" was followed by further number ones at the UK Singles Chart, "Mi Chico Latino", "Lift Me Up" and "Bag It Up". The album itself reached a peak at number four in the United Kingdom and sold 600,000 copies there, making it double platinum. Halliwell was nominated at BRIT Awards ceremony in 2000, for Best British Female Solo Artist and Best Pop Act, she also performed "Bag It Up" during the show, emerging between giant inflatable legs, ripping off her shirt and walking in stiletto heels over the backs of topless pink-haired men whilst performing the song. Schizophonic debuted at number 42 on the Billboard 200 before dropping out within the next month. The album was eventually certified gold, distributing over 500,000 copies. The album ended up selling around two million copies worldwide.

In 2001, Halliwell followed up with her second album, Scream If You Wanna Go Faster, the album peaked at number five in the United Kingdom and sold 200,000 copies there and was certified gold. It included her cover version of the Weather Girls' 1983 hit, "It's Raining Men", was also used on the Bridget Jones's Diary film soundtrack and the video game DDRMAX2 Dance Dance Revolution 7thMix. The song was released as the lead single from the album. "Its Raining Men" became a major hit worldwide, it peaked at number one in the United Kingdom and peaked in the top 10 in over 27 countries, becoming Halliwell's biggest hit to date. The song won her the International Song of the Year award at the 2002 NRJ Music Awards. The singles that followed, "Scream If You Wanna Go Faster" and "Calling", reached number eight and number seven in the United Kingdom, respectively. Halliwell released a special French edition of "Calling", titled "Au Nom de L'amour". In 2002 Halliwell was once again nominated at the BRIT Awards, this time for Best British Female Solo Artist and Best British Single for "It's Raining Men".

In late 2004 Halliwell made a return to music with the single "Ride It", which reached number four in the United Kingdom and number one on the dance charts. However, several months elapsed before another single was released, during which time she was apparently instructed to record some new tracks for the as yet unreleased album by her record company, which was unhappy with the setlist. Halliwell planned her first solo tour of the United Kingdom and Ireland, but due to lack of ticket sales, compounded by the label's pressure on Halliwell to record additional songs, led to the cancellation of the tour. Eventually, a new single, "Desire", was released on 30 May 2005, reaching number 22 in the UK Singles Chart and number one on the UK Dance Charts. Released shortly after, the source album, Passion, similarly received little attention from the public or critics and stalled at number 41 in the British charts. Halliwell's recording contract with EMI was subsequently not renewed and she stated that she was not interested in recording another album at that time and was content with writing children's books and motherhood.

2007–2014: Spice Girls reunion and return to music

On 29 June 2007, the Spice Girls regrouped and announced plans for a reunion tour, from which they were said to have earned £10 million each (about US$20 million). The group's members said that they were still enjoying "doing their own thing". The group decided to tour as a quintet and release their first compilation album, a collection of their Greatest Hits. This album was released in early November 2007 and the tour began on 2 December 2007. During the reformation, film maker Bob Smeaton directed an official film of the tour, which he titled Spice Girls: Giving You Everything. In addition to their sell-out tour, the Spice Girls were contracted to appear in Tesco advertisements, for which they were paid £1 million each. In March 2010, vocal coach and singer Carrie Grant announced on ITV1's The Alan Titchmarsh Show that Halliwell would be making a return to music. In April 2010, Halliwell posted a message on her website, saying she was back in the studio and referring to Lady Gaga as one of her influences. In May 2011, reports suggested that Halliwell would be making a return to music. On 31 July 2011, Halliwell confirmed she had been working on her fourth album, stating of it, "The album's pretty much finished."

In February 2012, Halliwell announced that the fourth album was being mastered. In August 2012, she reunited with the Spice Girls to perform as a quintet at the closing ceremony of the Olympic Games in London. This was the last Spice Girls concert to feature Victoria Beckham. The group also teamed up with Jennifer Saunders and Judy Craymer to develop a musical based on the songs of the Spice Girls titled Viva Forever!, which opened on 11 December 2012. In October 2012, Halliwell made her first solo performance in seven years at the Breast Cancer Care, debuting a new track called "Phenomenal Woman". In January 2013, Halliwell claimed that she had decided to shelve the album she had finished to continue writing and recording, moving in a different style direction.

On 5 September 2013, it was confirmed by Channel 9's NRL Footy Show (one of the longest-running shows in Australia) that Halliwell would be performing a world exclusive of "Half of Me", her first solo single in nearly eight years, at its grand final show. The performance took place on 3 October 2013, exactly one year after her last exhibition with new material at the Breast Cancer Care Show. On 12 September 2013, it was announced that the song "Half of Me" would be released exclusively in Australia, as part of a new deal with Sony Music Australia. The single was released on 25 October 2013 and reached number 281 in the Australian charts. Halliwell then took to her official blog to write about her upsetting experience back in the music business and hinted of possibly retiring for good. On the grand final of Australia's Got Talent, she performed an acoustic version of the Spice Girls' hit single "Wannabe".

2015–present: GEM, Spice25 and Spiceworld25

As of 2015, Halliwell is still working on new material for her fourth studio album, which has yet to be released after multiple delays. Three tracks were confirmed : "Love and Light", "Phenomenal Woman" and "Sheriff".

In July 2016, Halliwell, Mel B and Bunton released a video celebrating the 20th anniversary of Spice Girls' debut single "Wannabe" and teased news from them as a three-piece; Beckham and Melanie C opted not to take part in a reunion project, with Mel B saying that both members gave the three-piece their blessing to continue with the project. However, following Halliwell's announcement of her pregnancy, the project was cancelled.

In November 2016, 13 songs from Halliwell's fourth album, reportedly titled Man on the Mountain, were leaked onto the internet, including the previously confirmed tracks "Love and Light", "Phenomenal Woman" and "Sheriff". The following June, Halliwell released a charity single, "Angels in Chains", a tribute to George Michael, to raise money for Childline. The single peaked at number 63 on the Official Singles Downloads Chart Top 100.

On 5 November 2018, the Spice Girls announced their reunion Spice World – 2019 Tour; Beckham declined to join due to commitments regarding her fashion business. The tour began in May 2019 and ended in June 2019.

In November 2020, Halliwell debuted an original YouTube series, Rainbow Woman, which she wrote, directed and served as an executive producer. The series features Halliwell taking part in series of vignettes that follow her on different adventures. In August 2021, she gave her voice to the short animated movie The Crown with a Shadow, directed by J.B. Ghuman Jr.

In November 2022, it was announced that Halliwell was added to the cast of the Gran Turismo, playing the wife of Djimon Hounsou.

Other ventures

Books

In 1999, Halliwell wrote the autobiography If Only, in which she described her life as a Spice Girl. The book went on to top the best-seller lists and sold over a million copies in the UK alone. Halliwell donated the profits made from the sales of her autobiography to a Breast Cancer charity. In 2002, she released her second autobiography, Just for the Record, detailing her rise to fame and her turbulent celebrity lifestyle.

On 12 April 2007, it was announced that Halliwell had signed a six-book deal with Macmillan Children's Books. The series of children's novels follow the adventures of nine-year-old Ugenia, a character based on Halliwell, alongside her friends Bronte, Rudy and Trevor. The character Princess Posh Vattoria, a caricature of Halliwell's bandmate Victoria Beckham, was featured in early drafts, but has not appeared in the book series. Other characters are said by Halliwell to be loosely based on Gordon Ramsay, George Michael, Marilyn Monroe, Vincent van Gogh, Wayne Rooney and the character Justin Suarez from the TV series Ugly Betty. According to the official site, the book sold more than 250,000 copies in its first 5 months, making Halliwell 2008's most successful female celebrity children's author.

In October 2022, Halliwell announced a new book deal with the UK branch of Scholastic. The first book announced will be an adventure story entitled Rosie Frost and the Falcon Queen. The story will be about an orphan who travels to Bloodstone Island — an island that is home to a school for extraordinary teens and a refuge for animals, where she uncovers a dark family secret. Halliwell said in a statement: “Rosie Frost has lived in my heart for a long time – and this feels just the right moment to introduce her to the world."

Fashion
In 2010, Halliwell partnered with British retailer Next to create a swimwear collection named "Geri by Next". This was followed by a Union Jack-motif clothing range in 2012, inspired by Halliwell's famous 1997 Union Jack dress.

Philanthropy
In 1998, Halliwell became a Goodwill Ambassador for the United Nations Population Fund (UNFPA). In 2000 Halliwell appeared in the two-part documentary series Geri's World Walkabout for the BBC, which followed her work with the UN and other travels. That same year, she gave the opening address at the UN Youth Summit. Halliwell picked up further UN work in 2006, by visiting Zambia from 14 to 16 November, to promote greater international awareness of the urgent need to reduce maternal death and halt the spread of HIV/AIDS. In September 2009, Halliwell, in her role as a Goodwill Ambassador of UNFPA, visited Nepal to help launch a national campaign to stop violence against women.

On 25 October 2015, the Mail on Sunday reported that Halliwell had been in talks with the Department for Education with a view to establishing a free school in north London, scheduled to open in 2018 and specialising in the arts and business. Halliwell told the newspaper: "I believe in education. It's an empowering fundamental human right that everyone deserves. Education is a foundation for life." The Department subsequently confirmed that it had spoken with Halliwell, but that discussions were at an early stage.

Politics
In the run-up to the 1997 general election, Halliwell declared: "I saw a lot of what Mrs. Thatcher did. She was definitely the original Spice Girl rising from the greengrocer's daughter to Prime Minister." She said her background was deeply rooted in support for the Conservative Party and that Thatcher was the pioneer of "Girl Power" and the spiritual sixth member of the Spice Girls. She said in 1996 that Tony Blair was "not a safe pair of hands for the economy". By the 2001 general election, Halliwell had switched her support to Tony Blair and the Labour Party, making a cameo appearance in one of their party election broadcasts.

In a 2007 interview with The Guardian, Halliwell said she was a feminist, but took issue with its image, explaining: "It's about branding. For me, feminism is bra-burning lesbianism. It's very unglamorous. I'd like to see it rebranded. We need to see a celebration of our femininity and softness."

Television, radio and film
In May 1999, Halliwell appeared in a 90-minute documentary Geri for the British television channel Channel 4 by Molly Dineen. The documentary was a ratings success with 4.5 million viewers—almost one-fifth of available viewers—and Channel 4 aired it again one month later. She has also released two yoga DVDs with her yoga teacher Katy Appleton, Geri Yoga and Geri Body Yoga. In late 2002, Halliwell was featured alongside Pete Waterman and Louis Walsh as a judge on the television series Popstars: The Rivals, which created Girls Aloud. and as a guest reporter on celebrity-based series Extra in the US. She has also made appearances in the television series Sex and the City and in the 2004 film Fat Slags, based on characters from Viz magazine. In 2004, Halliwell appeared on Channel Five as one of the hosts of the Party in the Park event for the Prince's Trust, the presenter and main performer of the Tickled Pink Girls' night in Live! event and an appearance in a documentary There's Something About Geri. Halliwell appeared in the film Crank: High Voltage alongside her friend, actor John Damon, and on the BBC One's The One Show on 7 May 2009.

In 2010, Halliwell stood in for Dannii Minogue as a guest judge on The X Factor at the Glasgow auditions alongside Simon Cowell, Louis Walsh and Cheryl, and she returned again as a guest judge in 2012 at the Liverpool auditions this time stood in for Kelly Rowland who replaced Dannii Minogue the year before alongside Walsh, Gary Barlow and Tulisa Contostavlos. In April 2013, the Nine Network announced that she would become the fourth judge on season seven of Australia's Got Talent replacing Minogue. She guest presented an episode of The One Show in October 2015. Halliwell appeared on episode three of the 2016 series of Sport Relief Bake Off. In March 2017, Halliwell presented the BBC Two documentary Geri's 90s: My Drive to Freedom as part of the BBC Music: My Generation series. She sat in for Zoë Ball on BBC Radio 2 in July 2017. She guest presented an episode of This Morning in August 2017 with Rylan Clark-Neal. In 2018, she was a judge on the Saturday night BBC One talent show All Together Now.

In 2022, it was announced that Halliwell will be joining the cast in the film Gran Turismo, based on the video game series of the same name. The film is scheduled for release on 11th August 2023. Halliwell, alongside actor Djimon Hounsou, will be cast as the parents of the teenager in the film.

Personal life

Halliwell gave birth to a daughter in May 2006. The child's father is screenwriter Sacha Gervasi with whom Halliwell was in a relationship in 2005; Victoria Beckham and Emma Bunton are godmothers. Halliwell began dating Christian Horner, the team principal of the Red Bull Racing Formula One team, in February 2014. They announced their engagement on 11 November 2014 and the couple were married on 15 May 2015 at St Mary's Church in Woburn, Bedfordshire.

In October 2016, Halliwell said that Horner and she were expecting their first child together. Halliwell gave birth to her second child, a son, on 21 January 2017. In a 2019 interview with Piers Morgan, Melanie Brown was asked if she had slept with Halliwell in an intimate manner and she nodded yes. Halliwell released a statement denying this, saying Brown's claim had been "hurtful to her family". Brown responded: "I just said it was like a little thing and we giggled about it the next day and that’s that. It’s the press [who] have taken it onto a whole new level."

Halliwell’s first dog Harry, came from Battersea Dogs & Cats Home. She later adopted Daisy, who survived life-saving liver surgery aged just six months old, as seen on Paul O'Grady: For the Love of Dogs.

Halliwell has spoken out about her experiences of bulimia, saying that she came close to death, weighing just , and was advised by Robbie Williams to seek medical help. In 2011, she spoke of being comfortable with her body and credits her newly healthy relationship with food to motherhood. After having previously been agnostic, Halliwell became a Christian after taking the Alpha Course evangelical program.

Halliwell's brother, Max, died on 17 November, 2021, at age 54. In 2022, Halliwell was awarded an honorary doctorate from Sheffield Hallam University.

Discography

 Schizophonic (1999)
 Scream If You Wanna Go Faster (2001)
 Passion (2005)

Bibliography
 1999: If Only
 2002: Just for the Record
 2008: Ugenia Lavender: The First Book
 2008: Ugenia Lavender and the Terrible Tiger
 2008: Ugenia Lavender and the Burning Pants
 2008: Ugenia Lavender: Home Alone
 2008: Ugenia Lavender and the Temple of Gloom
 2008: Ugenia Lavender: The One and Only

Filmography

Awards and nominations

References

External links

 
 

 
1972 births
20th-century English women singers
20th-century English singers
20th-century English women writers
20th-century English memoirists
20th-century philanthropists
21st-century English women singers
21st-century English singers
21st-century English women writers
21st-century English memoirists
21st-century English novelists
21st-century philanthropists
21st-century English actresses
Actors from Watford
Actresses from Hertfordshire
Audiobook narrators
English autobiographers
English children's writers
English Christians
English dance musicians
English film actresses
English people of French descent
English people of Spanish descent
English people of Swedish descent
English philanthropists
British women children's writers
English women non-fiction writers
English women pop singers
English women singer-songwriters
Converts to Anglicanism from atheism or agnosticism
Dance-pop musicians
Innocent Records artists
Living people
Musicians from Hertfordshire
Page 3 girls
People educated at Camden School for Girls
People educated at Watford Grammar School for Girls
Musicians from Watford
Spice Girls members
Video game musicians
Virgin Records artists